Brian Wright (1918–2013) was an Australian writer, announcer, producer and director best known for his work on TV and radio. He co-created Spyforce.

References

External links

Papers at Macquarie University
Brian Wright at National Film and Sound Archive

Australian writers
1918 births
2013 deaths